In order to expand the acceptance of their credit and debit cards, many networks, such as Discover, JCB, UnionPay, BC Card, RuPay and TROY create alliances with other networks.

Existing reciprocal agreements 
The table below is designed so that one can easily look up his/her branded card in the first column, and see what other networks it is accepted on.  Information, naturally, will be repeated as a result.

References

Credit card issuer associations